The Gentleman of Heligoland is the nickname of an unidentified decedent whose body was found in the waters off Heligoland in 1994. His body showed signs of having been beaten and his death is a suspected case of murder.

Discovery
Police believe that the body may have travelled  some distance in the water.

Investigation
An autopsy in 1994 showed that the deceased had suffered blunt force violence to his head and upper body while he was still alive. He was nicknamed "The Gentleman" because he was smartly dressed.

Exhumation
In December 2021 the body was exhumed and DNA extracted to compare against databases of known samples. Researchers at Staffordshire University and Plymouth Marjon University are working with the German Police Academy of Lower Saxony and Locate International to identify him.

2022 appeal
In February 2022 police released a photofit and new information on the deceased as part of an appeal to the media to identify him. It was revealed that his tie was made by Marks & Spencer for English and French language markets, which included Canada at the time.

It was also revealed that his body had two cast iron shoe lasts attached to it.

Police also wished to dispel the notion that the man was wealthy, as the tie had been manufactured in large numbers and the shoes had been repaired and may have been secondhand.

As of 28 April 2022 the police had received over 50 pieces of information since the appeal.

Bone analysis 
A radio isotope analysis conducted in 2022 at Murdoch University determined that The Gentleman may have spent most of his life in Australia.

References

Unidentified decedents
Unsolved crimes in Germany
1994 deaths